The 2021 Categoría Primera A season  (officially known as the 2021 Liga BetPlay Dimayor season for sponsorship reasons) was the 74th season of the Categoría Primera A, Colombia's top-flight football league. The season began on 16 January and ended on 22 December 2021. América de Cali entered the season as defending champions having won back-to-back titles in the 2019 Finalización and 2020 tournaments.

The Torneo Apertura was won by Deportes Tolima, who claimed their third league title on 20 June after beating Millonarios by a 2–1 score in the second leg of the finals and a 3–2 score on aggregate, whilst the Torneo Finalización was won by Deportivo Cali, who beat the defending champions Deportes Tolima by a 3–2 aggregate score in the finals to claim their tenth league title.

Format
The competition format for this season was approved by the General Assembly of DIMAYOR on 17 December 2020:

 Two tournaments with three stages each were played in the season. The Torneo Apertura was contested by 19 teams, while the Torneo Finalización was played by 20 teams.
 The first stage of both tournaments was contested on a single round-robin basis, with each team playing the other teams once for a total of 18 or 19 games. The additional match against a regional rival would not be played in this season. The top eight teams after the 19 rounds of each tournament qualified for the next stage.
 The second stage of each tournament had a knockout round contested by the top eight teams at the end of the first stage, with the top four teams being seeded for the quarter-finals and paired against a rival decided by draw. The quarter-finals were played under a format of double-legged series with the winners advancing to the semi-finals, which were also played over two legs.
 The finals in both tournaments were contested by the winners of each semi-final tie, playing a double-legged series for the championship.
 One team was relegated to Categoría Primera B at the end of the Torneo Apertura, being replaced in the Torneo Finalización by two teams promoted from the Primera B in order to return to 20 teams for the second half of the year. This was due to the decision of DIMAYOR's General Assembly to postpone relegation from the 2020 season to the end of the first semester of 2021, in order to ensure teams could be able to play the same amount of matches as originally scheduled before the onset of the COVID-19 pandemic and the temporary suspension of the previous season. At the end of the Torneo Finalización and the season, two teams were relegated to the second tier.

On 12 July 2021, DIMAYOR announced changes to the format of the Torneo Finalización, including the extra match against a regional rival for a total of 20 first stage games and replacing the knockout stage for a semi-final stage in which the eight qualified teams were split into two groups of four where they will play each other team in their group twice. The group winners advanced to the double-legged final series.

Teams
21 teams took part in the season, 19 of them returning from last season plus Atlético Huila and Deportes Quindío, who were promoted from the 2021 Primera B. Cúcuta Deportivo, who also competed in the top flight in 2020, did not take part in the competition this season as they entered liquidation, were forced to forfeit their final two games of the previous tournament, and were ultimately disaffiliated from DIMAYOR on 25 November 2020.

Stadia and locations

The following two teams competed in the 2021 Finalización tournament, replacing Boyacá Chicó who were relegated to Primera B at the end of the Apertura tournament:

Managerial changes

Notes

Torneo Apertura

First stage

Standings

Results

Knockout stage

Bracket

Quarter-finals

|}

First leg

Second leg

Semi-finals

|}

First leg

Second leg

Finals

Deportes Tolima won 3–2 on aggregate.

Top scorers

Source: Soccerway

Relegation
A separate table is kept to determine the teams that are relegated to the Categoría Primera B for the next season. This table is elaborated from a sum of all first stage games played for the current season and the previous two seasons (six tournaments). For purposes of elaborating the table, promoted teams are given the same point and goal tallies as the team in the 18th position at the start of the season.

Due to the postponement of promotion and relegation from the previous season to the end of the first semester of 2021 and the disaffiliation of Cúcuta Deportivo, one team was relegated to Primera B at the end of the Torneo Apertura.

Source: DimayorRules for classification: 1st points; 2nd goal difference; 3rd goals scored; 4th away goals scored.

Torneo Finalización

First stage

Standings

Results

Semi-finals
The eight teams that advanced to the semi-finals were drawn into two groups of four teams, with the top two teams of the first stage being seeded in each group. The group winners advanced to the finals.

Group A

Group B

Finals

Deportivo Cali won 3–2 on aggregate.

Top scorers
{| class="wikitable" border="1"
|-
! Rank
! Name
! Club
! Goals
|-
| align=center | 1
| Harold Preciado
|Deportivo Cali
| align=center | 13
|-
| align=center | 2
| Fernando Uribe
|Millonarios
| align=center | 12
|-
| align=center | 3
| Jefferson Duque
|Atlético Nacional
| align=center | 10
|-
| align=center | 4
| Bayron Garcés
|Alianza Petrolera
| align=center | 9
|-
| rowspan=3 align=center | 5
| Juan Fernando Caicedo
|Deportes Tolima
| rowspan=3 align=center | 7
|-
| Luis González
|Junior
|-
| Adrián Ramos
|América de Cali
|-
| rowspan=8 align=center | 8
| Larry Angulo
|América de Cali
| rowspan=8 align=center | 6
|-
| Edwuin Cetré
|Junior
|-
| Wilfrido de La Rosa
|Deportivo Pereira
|-
| Teófilo Gutiérrez
|Deportivo Cali
|-
| Pablo Lima
|La Equidad
|-
| Juan David Pérez
|Once Caldas
|-
| Gustavo Ramírez
|Deportes Tolima
|-
| Andrés Rentería
|Jaguares
|}

Source: Soccerway

Relegation
The bottom two teams of the relegation table were relegated to Categoría Primera B for the 2022 season at the end of the Torneo Finalización, with this table taking into consideration the six most recent tournaments (2018–II, 2019–I, 2019–II, 2020, 2021–I and 2021–II). For purposes of elaborating the table, Atlético Huila and Deportes Quindío, who were promoted from Primera B at the end of the first half of the season, were given the same point and goal tallies as the team in the 18th position at the start of the Finalización tournament (Deportivo Pereira).

Source: DimayorRules for classification: 1st points; 2nd goal difference; 3rd goals scored; 4th away goals scored.

Aggregate table
The aggregate table includes the results of teams in all stages in the Torneo Apertura and Torneo Finalización, and awards one berth to the Copa Libertadores and three berths to the Copa Sudamericana. As an exceptional measure for this season, and due to promotion and relegation being implemented halfway into the season, the two teams promoted for the Torneo Finalización (Atlético Huila and Deportes Quindío) entered with the same matches, points, and goals as the team in 19th place in this table at the end of the Apertura tournament (Alianza Petrolera).

See also
 2021 Categoría Primera B season
 2021 Copa Colombia

References

External links
 Dimayor's official website 

Categoría Primera A seasons
1
Colombia